Dolores del Carmen Gutiérrez Zurita (born 7 October 1963) is a Mexican politician affiliated with the PRD. As of 2014 she served as Senator of the LXI Legislature of the Mexican Congress representing Tabasco as replacement of Arturo Núñez Jiménez.

References

1963 births
Living people
Politicians from Tabasco
Women members of the Senate of the Republic (Mexico)
Members of the Senate of the Republic (Mexico)
Party of the Democratic Revolution politicians
21st-century Mexican politicians
21st-century Mexican women politicians
Universidad Autónoma de Guadalajara alumni
Academic staff of Universidad Juárez Autónoma de Tabasco
People from Villahermosa